Nancy Kangeryuaq Sevoga (born 1936) is an Inuit artist.

Her work is included in the collections of the National Gallery of Canada and the Art Gallery of Guelph.

References

 1936 births
20th-century Canadian artists
20th-century Canadian women artists
21st-century Canadian artists
21st-century Canadian women artists
Inuit artists
Living people